Almura or Almoura was a town of ancient Lydia, inhabited during Roman times.
 
Its site is located near , Asiatic Turkey.

References

Populated places in ancient Lydia
Former populated places in Turkey
Roman towns and cities in Turkey
History of İzmir Province
Tire District